By the end and in the aftermath of World War II, POW camps administered by France existed in the territory of France and the zones of French occupation in Germany and in Austria.

Researcher  gives the following list of POW camp locations.

Austria
The French established prisoner of war camps in the French occupation zone of Austria, namely Vorarlberg and the Tyrol. 

 Bregenz
 Feldkirch
 Gscheid (?)
 Lustenau
 Rum (near Innsbruck)
 Sankt Peter am Wimberg
 Wörgl

Germany

 Ailingen
 Andernach
 Baden-Baden
 Ering
 Friedrichshafen
 Kehl
 Koblenz
 Lindau
 Murnau
 Offenburg
 Ostheim
 Saarbrücken

France

 Agde
 Amboise
 Attichy
 Aubagne
 Auberchicourt, Nord
 Avignon
 Bar-sur-Aube
 Beaune-la-Rolande
 Besançon
 Béthune
 Breisac
 Brévannes
 Brienne-le-Château
 Brumath
 Caen
 Cahors
 Camp de Livron, Caylus, Tarn-et-Garonne
 Camp de Thoré
 Camp des Anamites
 Camp des Defends par Châteauroux
 Camp des Sables-Fortet
 Castres
 Châlons-sur-Marne
 Champenoise-Vigole
 Châteauroux
 Cherbourg
 Clermont-Ferrand
 Colmar
 Colombes
 Comper-en-Concoret
 Cormeilles-en-Parisis
 Cotentin
 Damigny
 Decise
 Dieppe
 Dijon
 Draguignan
 Épinal
 Ergm
 Espagot
 Évron
 Farges, Morbihan 
 Ferrières-la-Verrerie
 Foix
 Fort de Cormeilles-en-Parisis
 Fort de Noisy-le-Sec, Romainville
 Fort Moselle
 Foucarville
 Fontainebleau
 Freisine
 Givers
 Grabyle
 Graffenstaden
 Grandville
 Haguenau
 Hatten
 Hénin-Liétard
 Hérault de Béziers
 La Bégude
 La Flèche
 La Trémouille pres Tulle
 Lamballe
 Le Havre
 Lens/Mericourt
 Liévin/Calonne
 Lille
 Lisle-sur-Tarn
 Lunéville
 Lyon
 Marckolsheim
 Marseville
 Märzwiller
 Méricourt
 Metz
 Mitrachin
 Montech
 Montélier
 Montier-en-Der
 Montoir-de-Bretagne, Brittany
 Mulhouse-St. Louis
 Mutzig
 N. Orléans
 Nice
 Nouvelle Annecy
 Parche
 Perpignan
 Préchac-sur-Adour
 Piemont
 Poitiers
 Quiéry-la-Motte
 Rennes
 Riquewihr
 Rittershoffen
 Rivesaltes
 Rouen
 Saint-Fons
 Saint-Jean-d'Angély
 Saint-Priest, Isère
 Satonay, Sausheim
 Sedan
 Sepmes
 Sermaize-les-Bains
 Sète /Montpellier, Hérault
 Strasbourg
 Toulouse
 Tours
 Vénissieux, Lyon
 Vernel
 Le Vernet, Ariège
 Versailles
 Ville de Pau
 Villemaur-sur-Vanne
 Vitry-le-François
 Voves
 Vuilnemin, Douai

References

 
 
France
Pri
Prisoner of war camps